The Arizona Museum of Natural History (originally the Mesa Southwest Museum) is the only natural history museum in the greater Phoenix area and is located in Mesa, Arizona. It exhibits the natural and cultural history of the Southwestern United States.

History
The Mesa Southwest Museum was founded as a small museum in Mesa City Hall in 1977 with a small collection of Arizona artifacts, in a building designed by Lescher & Mahoney and built in 1937 with WPA funds, that originally housed Mesa City Hall, municipal courts, city library, police and fire departments. There were expansions to the building in 1983 and 1987, and in 2000 a new wing was added. A research facility was also added in 1995. Additionally, the museum has prominent research curators in the fields of paleontology and archeology/anthropology. 

The museum was renamed to the Arizona Museum of Natural History in 2007. Recent annual attendance is about 139,998.

Exhibitions
The Museum has a three-story indoor waterfall on Dinosaur Mountain, which features animatronic dinosaurs and a flash flood display that runs every 30 minutes. Other exhibitions include Dinosaur Hall, a real territorial jail, and a recreation of the Lost Dutchman's Gold Mine. The Southwest Gallery consists of a native peoples’ gallery, with exhibits about Paleoindian big game hunters and gatherers, the first inhabitants of North America, and the Desert Cultures that developed later. It also holds a recreation of a Hohokam village, with pithouses and above-ground structures, outfitted with real artifacts as they might have been from about A.D. 600–1450. Another exhibit is the Ancient Cultures of Mexico. The Origins gallery  is designed as a voyage through the timeline of the cosmos and discusses major events in the history of planet Earth.

Among the exhibitions is a hands-on Exploration Station and the Paleo Dig Pit.

Three changing exhibition galleries offer a variety of subjects. The evolution of flight—was it from the ground-up or from the tree down?  AzMNH's exhibition, "Rulers of the Prehistoric Skies," helped to answer that question. The exhibit has since been removed, but the pterosaurs are still visible throughout the museum.

At no other time in the history of life on Earth were there animals like the pterosaurs, those flying creatures who truly did rule the sky. They were the first vertebrates to achieve flight, and they did it in a way that was all their own. In addition to very distinctly shaped, thin, hollow bones, pterosaurs had membranous wings which were probably flexible and able to change shape during flight.  The actual mechanical details are not completely understood by paleontologists, thus giving rise to multiple opinions.

The main goal of the exhibit was to have visitors understand the amazing diversity among Pterosaurs. Exhibit volunteers helped to achieve this goal by building everything from “rock blocks” and puzzles, to actual models of the fliers themselves. Don Puffer created a 4-foot mechanical Dsungaripterous pterosaur also known as “Clam Digger” that demonstrated the opening and closing of its wings. Ed Mack's sculpture Pteranodon sternbergi is a stunning life-size model that should amaze the museum audience and now hangs over Dinosaur Mountain.

"Rulers of the Prehistoric Skies" was part of a Mesa Arts and Culture First Flight initiative and focused on flying reptiles; however the exhibit also explored the evolution of flight from insects, the true first flyers, to birds and bats.

The "Rulers of the Prehistoric Skies" exhibit opened on February 4, 2012, and ran for approximately four years due to its popularity.

Another of the changing exhibits was "The Primal Desert Next Door: Land of Black Volcanoes and White Sands," which opened February 26, 2011 and closed in January 2013. Much of the Sonoran Desert lies south of the Arizona border in Mexico. This vast expanse and its diverse wildlife is the focus of this exhibition, which included wall murals depicting the vast contrasting dark “moon-scape” volcanic fields and bright seas of sand dunes. Visitors were able to learn about the geology, flora, and fauna of this region though photographs and interactive components. The exhibition was based on the book Land of Black Volcanoes and White Sands, The Pinacate and Gran Desierto De Altar Biosphere Reserve, by Larry Marshall and Clark Blake.  Interactive features included a dune machine, which replicated the phenomena of sand dunes, a hands-on basin and range topography display, and a mock lava tube, which children could climb through. This exhibition has since been replaced. For all current and future exhibitions, please visit http://www.azmnh.org

AzMNH exhibitions are made possible, in large part, by private donations to the Arizona Museum of Natural History Foundation, the Museum's 501(c)(3) nonprofit organization.

Additionally, the museum maintains the Sirrine House, a Queen Anne style home built in Mesa in 1896. The museum claims that the home is the only fully restored Victorian-era home museum.  The Sirrine House is currently  open only for special events.

Paleontology
The Paleontology Section, which is the study of past life, is the primary emphasis of the Natural History Section of the Arizona Museum of Natural History. The Natural History Section explores, excavates, records, prepares, conserves, and researches the fossil resources in the collection at AzMNH. In addition to working with state, university, and municipal agencies, AzMNH is an official repository for specimens collected from State, Bureau of Land Management (BLM), National Forest, and Fish and Wildlife lands throughout Arizona.

The Dinosaur Hall features an unnamed coelurosaur nicknamed the "Zuni coelurosaur", a Tarbosaurus skeleton and a Tyrannosaurus rex skull. Also they feature a Gastornis. As sauropods they have a Camarasaurus skeleton and an Apatosaurus femur. As ceratopsians they have a Psittacosaurus skeleton, a Zuniceratops, Protoceratops, Pentaceratops and Triceratops and as iguanodonts they consist solely on a Probactrosaurus.

Archeology/Anthropology
The Anthropology Section of the Arizona Museum of Natural History conducts research and develops exhibitions on Native American cultures and the archaeology of southern Arizona. Archaeology has been a major focus of the museum since its inception in 1977. The museum sponsors ongoing excavation at the Mesa Grande Ruin, a large mound in Mesa dating from the Hohokam Classic Period. This is one of the most important tasks of the anthropology department. The opening of Mesa Grande as a heritage site dedicated to public education concerning the Hohokam and O'odham people remains a central goal of the museum.

Exhibits
The following images are of some of the exhibits in the museum.

References

External links
 Arizona Museum of Natural History – museum website

Archaeological museums in Arizona
Dinosaur museums in the United States
History museums in Arizona
Museums established in 1977
Museums in Mesa, Arizona
Native American museums in Arizona
Natural history museums in Arizona
1977 establishments in Arizona
Paleontology in Arizona